Wahidul Haque ( – 3 July 2020) was the Finance Minister of Bangladesh. He was also an emeritus professor at the University of Toronto, Canada.

Career 
Haq completed his master's degree at University of Dhaka in 1955 and did his PhD at Stanford University in California, USA. He was professor of economics at Islamabad University in 1969. He has taught at Dhaka University. He then taught at the University of California, Berkeley for a while, then joined the University of Toronto as a professor and settled there permanently. He was the finance minister during Ershad's rule from September 1988 to May 1990.

Death 
Wahidul Haq died on 3 July 2020.

References 

1930s births
2020 deaths
Finance ministers of Bangladesh
Government ministers of Bangladesh
Stanford University School of Engineering alumni
University of Dhaka alumni
Academic staff of the University of Dhaka
UC Berkeley College of Engineering faculty
Jatiya Party politicians